Marvi Pir Mazhar was a member of Pakistan Peoples Party in Sindh Assembly in 2003 to 2008. She was elected from PS-74 Dadu-IV in Dadu, Sindh, Pakistan. Marvi Mazhar is the daughter of Pir Mazhar Ul Haq the parliamentary leader of Pakistan Peoples Party in Sindh Assembly and present Senior Minister with the Portfolio of Education in the Sindh Cabinet. She is the great grand daughter of former Chief Minister of Sindh, Pir Ilahi Bux, and of Qazi Akbar, long serving Sindh Provincial Minister.  She is the great niece of Dr. Fahmida Mirza, the ex-Speaker of the National Assembly of Pakistan and great grand niece of ex-Federal Minister Qazi Abdul Majeed Abid. She was a member of Sindh Assembly's Standing Committee on Education.

See also 
 Pir Ilahi Bux
 Pir Mazhar Ul Haq
 Fahmida Mirza
 Qazi Abdul Majeed Abid
 Qazis of Hyderabad
 Pakistan Peoples Party

External links 
 Marvi Mazhar profile at Sindh Assembly

Year of birth missing (living people)
Living people
Pakistan People's Party politicians
Sindhi people